The 2023 Club Atlético Boca Juniors season is the 95th consecutive season in the top flight of Argentine football. In addition to the domestic league, Boca Juniors will participate in this season's editions of the Copa de la Liga Profesional, the Supercopa Argentina, the Copa Argentina, the Trofeo de Campeones de la Liga Profesional and the 2023 Copa Libertadores.

Season overview

January
Ezequiel Fernández and Nicolás Valentini return from their loans. Boca and Carlos Zambrano agreed to mutually terminate the forward's contract, Zambrano subsequently joined Alianza Lima.  Nazareno Solís returns from Alvarado, and is loaned again, to Patronato.  Defender Bruno Valdez arrives as a free agent.  Boca started the season losing 1-2 against Racing in the Supercopa Internacional. Agustín Rossi is loaned until the end of the season to Al Nassr.  Boca won 1-0 against Atlético Tucumán the first match of Primera Division. Aaron Molinas is loaned until the end of the season to Tigre.

February
Miguel Merentiel is loaned until the end of the season from Palmeiras.  On february 5, Boca drew 0-0 against Central Córdoba (SdE). On february 11 Boca lost 1-2 against Talleres (C). On february 19 Boca won 3-1 against Platense. On february 25 Boca won 2-1 against Vélez Sarsfield.

March
On march 1 Boca defeated Patronato 3-0 and won their second Supercopa Argentina. On march 6, Boca drew 0-0 against Defensa y Justicia. On march 12 Boca lost 0-1 against Banfield. On march 19 Boca lost 2-3 against Instituto.

Current squad

Last updated on March 20, 2023.

Transfers

Summer

In

Out

Winter

In

Out

Competitions

Overall

Primera División

League table

International Qualification

Relegation table

Results summary

Results by round

Matches

Copa de la Liga Profesional

Group stage

Zone 2

Results summary

Results by round

Matches

Copa Argentina

Round of 64

Supercopa Argentina

Trofeo de Campeones

Supercopa Internacional

Copa Libertadores

Group stage

Team statistics

Season Appearances and goals

|-
! colspan="16" style="background:#00009B; color:gold; text-align:center"| Goalkeepers

|-
! colspan="16" style="background:#00009B; color:gold; text-align:center"| Defenders

|-
! colspan="16" style="background:#00009B; color:gold; text-align:center"| Midfielders

|-
! colspan="16" style="background:#00009B; color:gold; text-align:center"| Forwards

 

 

|-
! colspan="16" style="background:#00009B; color:gold; text-align:center"| Players who have made an appearance or had a squad number this season, but have left the club

|}

Top scorers

Top assists

Penalties

Clean sheets

Disciplinary record

Notes

References

External links
 Club Atlético Boca Juniors official web site 

Club Atlético Boca Juniors seasons
2023 in Argentine football